Last Letters Home: Voices of American Troops from the Battlefields of Iraq is a 2004-hour-long HBO documentary by Bill Couturié about U.S. soldiers killed in the Iraq War. The soldiers featured are:
Capt. Josh Byers
Sgt. Frank Carvill
2nd Lt. Leonard M. Cowherd
PFC. Jesse Givens
PFC. Raheen Heighter
Capt. Pierre Piché
PFC. Francisco (Pancho) Martinez-Flores
Specialist Robert Wise
Specialist Michelle Witmer
PFC. Holly McGeogh

References

External links

2004 television films
2004 films
Documentary films about the Iraq War
American documentary television films
HBO Films films
Films directed by Bill Couturié
2000s English-language films
2000s American films